A list of films produced by the Israeli film industry in 1977.

1977 releases

See also
1977 in Israel

References

External links
 Israeli films of 1977 at the Internet Movie Database

Israeli
Film
1977